King's House or Kings House may mean:

Carcosa Seri Negara, the former official residence for British High Commissioners in Malaya in Kuala Lumpur, Malaysia
Kings House, Hove, a Grade II listed 19th century house in Hove, East Sussex, England
Kings House Hotel, a remote inn and hotel at the eastern end of Glen Coe, in the Scottish Highlands
King's House, Jamaica, the official residence of the Governor General of Jamaica
King's House School, an independent day preparatory school in Richmond, England
King's House, Slaidburn, a youth hostel in Slaidburn, Lancashire, England
King's House, Winchester, a late 17th-century planned royal palace in the English county of Hampshire
Königshaus am Schachen, a small castle in Schachen Witterstein, Bavaria, Germany